Chen Da Wei is a Chinese violinist serving as first violinist in the Singapore Symphony Orchestra. Born in Shanghai, Chen began studies on the violin at the age of eight. His teacher was Tan Shuzhen, a well-known violin professor at the Shanghai Conservatory of Music. Chen Da Wei was also a prize winner in the Shanghai Young Musician Competition. Chen was previously with the Shanghai Symphony Orchestra for eight years before joining the Singapore Symphony Orchestra in 1989.

External links
 Singapore Symphony Orchestra biography
 

Living people
Chinese classical violinists
Musicians from Shanghai
21st-century classical violinists
Year of birth missing (living people)